Denise Everhart (born June 7, 1954) is an American politician who served as a Democratic member of the Kansas House of Representatives from 1989 to 1994. A resident of Topeka, Kansas, she represented the 53rd and 59th House districts. 

Everhart was initially elected to the 59th district and served one term there before switching to the 53rd district.

References

1954 births
Living people
Democratic Party members of the Kansas House of Representatives
20th-century American politicians
20th-century American women politicians
Women state legislators in Kansas
Politicians from Topeka, Kansas